Stuck in Love is a 2012 American romantic comedy-drama film written and directed by Josh Boone in his directorial debut. The independent film stars Jennifer Connelly, Greg Kinnear, Lily Collins, Nat Wolff, and Logan Lerman. It focuses on the complicated relationships between a successful novelist, played by Kinnear, his ex-wife (Connelly), their college daughter (Collins), and their teenage son (Wolff). The film began a limited theatrical release in the United States on July 5, 2013.

Plot
  
Novelist and part-time teacher Bill Borgens  has been floundering since his wife, Erica, left him for a younger man two years ago. Instead of working on a new book, he spies on Erica and her new husband Martin while pretending to be jogging. Bill's son Rusty  is a high school student in love with a classmate named Kate  but lacks the courage to talk to her. Bill's daughter, Sam, is a cynical college student who prefers one-night stands and hookups with people she knows are less intelligent than herself in order to shield herself from love.

On Thanksgiving, Bill has a reluctant Rusty set a place for Erica. At dinner, Sam announces that her first novel has been accepted for publication. Bill, having raised his children to be writers from birth, is thrilled, but becomes annoyed when she admits the book is not the one he had been helping her write. Rusty smokes weed before he goes to a second Thanksgiving dinner with Erica and Martin, but Sam refuses to join, citing Erica's betrayal of Bill.

While at a bar, Sam's classmate Lou tries to prevent her from initiating a hook-up with a sleazy guy. Despite being rebuffed, he continues to pursue her and eventually strong-arms her into a cup of coffee. While discussing their favorite books, Sam is unnerved by their similar tastes in literature and runs off, refusing to be roped into a relationship. When Lou stops coming to the writing seminar they both attend, Sam is saddened by his absence and tracks him down to the house where he takes care of his mother, who is dying. Sam realizes how much she cares for Lou and agrees to go out with him. When they discuss Sam's novel she reveals that a scene in which the main character sees her mother having sex with a man on the beach was about Erica and Martin. When Martin worried if Bill might see them, Erica replied, "I don't care." While listening to Lou's favorite song, Between the Bars by Elliott Smith, Sam begins to cry, afraid of being hurt by a failed relationship. Lou tells her he won't hurt her, and they share a kiss.

Rusty reads a poem in class about an angel, but the poem is actually about his crush and classmate Kate. Bill pays Sam and Rusty to write frequently in their journals and reads Rusty's journal to check in on his writing progress. When Rusty catches him, Bill tells Rusty that he worries he's letting life pass him by and needs to really experience life in order to become a better writer. Rusty and his friend Jason bribe their way into a party held by Kate's boyfriend, Glen. Rusty inadvertently sees Kate and Glen doing cocaine in the bathroom, leaving him dispirited. He and Jason are about to leave when they witness Kate and Glen arguing; when Glen shoves Kate to the ground, Rusty punches him in the face and flees with Kate and Jason. Since Kate can't go home bruised and high, Rusty brings her to his house. While tucking her into bed, she asks Rusty if his angel poem was about her; he admits it was. They share a kiss and begin a relationship. On Christmas Day, they have sex in his closet, which she believes neither of them will forget since it is Rusty's first time having sex and Kate's first time having sex in a closet. Sam and Bill are seen joking about Rusty's coming-of-age and sexual escapades. For Christmas, Rusty gives Kate a copy of It, his favorite novel, and she gives him her favorite album. At the same time Kate struggles with her drug addiction; while visiting Erica's house, she rifles through a medicine cabinet and is on the verge of stealing prescription drugs when Erica walks in on her.

Bill has regular sexual liaisons with his married neighbor, Tricia, with whom he occasionally jogs. However, he continues to mope over his failed marriage. While Christmas shopping he runs into Erica and they talk over coffee. He tells her that, if given a second chance, he would be a much better husband, leaving Erica visibly uneasy. Tricia urges him to move on and begin dating again, helping him dress better and creating an online dating profile. After going on a somewhat successful date, he stops by Erica's house and peeks in her window. Seeing her read a book, he leaves his wedding ring as a sign that he has moved on. However, he does a double take and realizes she is reading one of his own books. Heartened, he takes back his ring.

Sam has a party for the launch of her book, where Bill makes a speech about the process of writing, quoting What We Talk About When We Talk About Love, his favorite book. Erica is invited by Lou, but is clearly uncomfortable and avoids conversation. Bill encourages her to talk to Sam by telling her that she stole what she thought was her moms favorite book from his library, showing that Sam still does care for her. But when Erica goes up to Sam, Sam pretends not to know her when signing Erica's copy of her novel. Sam is infuriated with Lou for inviting Erica, and tells him she no longer wants to see him. Sam gives Kate champagne—unaware of Kate's addiction and ignoring the fact that she's underage—Kate goes back for more and is eventually incapacitated due to the mixture of drugs and alcohol. Gus, one of Sam's classmates, takes an incapacitated Kate to his home, which causes the Borgens to panic and track her down. Bill and Erica barge into Gus's apartment and find her unconscious in his bedroom after a night of drinking and doing drugs. As Kate is loaded into the car, Rusty lifts the blanket covering her and realizes that Kate was sexually assaulted, which leaves him in tears.

Devastated, Rusty turns to alcohol and comes home drunk almost every night. While at a convenience store with Jason he runs into Glen, who chases down and beats him. Kate writes Rusty a letter apologizing and telling him she's in rehab, having realized the only person who could truly fix her is herself. She hopes that one day she could be worthy of somebody like him. Bill, worried about Rusty, tells him to channel his pain into his writing. Rusty asks if he did the same when Erica left, prompting Bill to ground him. Rusty writes a story titled "I've Just Seen a Face" (after the Beatles song of the same name, which he told Sam he hears when thinking of Kate) and finds it therapeutic. Later, he gets a call from Stephen King, his favorite author, who tells him that Sam sent his story to King, who had it published in The Magazine of Fantasy and Science Fiction.

A frustrated Sam tells Bill he needs to move on from Erica. Bill then reveals to Sam that he walked out on Erica when Sam was a baby, and that when he came back six months later she accepted him, having waited for him the whole time. He promised that if she ever left him, he'd wait and give her a second chance like she did for him. Lou calls Sam when his mother dies, which makes Sam realize her own mistakes and how much her mother means to her. She visits Erica and they tearfully reconcile. Sam and Lou get back together, and Sam helps him through his mothers' death.

The film cuts to a year later, and Bill shows he's moved on from Erica by not setting a place for her at the table for Thanksgiving. It is also mentioned that Rusty and Kate are back together, and Kate is in a much healthier place now. As the family sits down to eat, joined by Lou, Rusty answers the doorbell and sees Erica standing there, and she tearfully asks if she can come in and join them for Thanksgiving. Bill is taken aback, but vocalizes that he is happy that Erica has finally come home. She joins them at the table, and Rusty announces his story is being published. While the family celebrates, Bill's narration again quotes from What We Talk About When We Talk About Love: "I could hear my heart beating. I could hear everyone's heart. I could hear the human noise we sat there making, not one of us moving, not even when the room went dark."

Cast
 Greg Kinnear as Bill Borgens
 Jennifer Connelly as Erica
 Lily Collins as Samantha Borgens
 Logan Lerman as Louis
 Nat Wolff as Rusty Borgens
 Kristen Bell as Tricia Walcott
 Liana Liberato as Kate
 Stephen King as himself (voice only)
 Spencer Breslin as Jason
 Patrick Schwarzenegger as Glen
 Rusty Joiner as Martin

Production
Stuck in Love started shooting in Wilmington, North Carolina in March 2012, primarily in the Wrightsville Beach area. Filming wrapped on April 6, 2012.

On March 6, 2012, it was announced that Lily Collins, Logan Lerman, Liana Liberato, Nat Wolff and Kristen Bell had joined the cast. It was also announced that the film would feature a cameo from Stephen King, as well as actors Rusty Joiner and Patrick Schwarzenegger in supporting roles. In November, the working title of the movie, Writers, was changed to Stuck in Love. In Australia and New Zealand it was released under the title A Place For Me and distributed by Becker Film Group.

Reception
On review aggregator Rotten Tomatoes, the film holds an approval rating of 58% based on 45 reviews. The website's critics consensus reads: "It struggles to enliven its uneven script, but Stuck in Love boasts enough winning performances from its solid veteran cast to offer an appealing diversion for rom-com enthusiasts." One of top critics commented, "The story, while unsurprising, is also quietly satisfying." On Metacritic, the film has a weighted average score of 49 out of 100, based on 13 critics, indicating "mixed or average reviews".

Soundtrack
Varèse Sarabande released the Stuck in Love – Original Motion Picture Soundtrack digitally on May 21 and on CD and vinyl June 11, 2013. The soundtrack features an original score by Mike Mogis and Nathaniel Walcott (from Bright Eyes), and new songs "At Your Door" (by Mike Mogis and Nathaniel Walcott featuring Big Harp), "You Are Your Mother's Child" (by Conor Oberst) and "Somersaults in Spring" (by Friends of Gemini: Corina Figueroa Escamilla, Nathaniel Walcott and Mike Mogis). Complete song track listing:
 "Home" • Edward Sharpe and the Magnetic Zeros 
 "At Your Door" • Nathaniel Walcott and Mike Mogis featuring Big Harp
 "You Are Your Mother's Child" • Conor Oberst
 "American Man" • Rio Bravo
 "Polkadot" • Like Pioneers  
 "Will You Be by Me" • Wallpaper Airplanes
 "I Won't Love You Any Less" • Nat & Alex Wolff
 "Between the Bars" • Elliott Smith
 "The Calendar Hung Itself..." • Bright Eyes
 "A Mountain, a Peak" • Bill Ricchini
 "Somersaults in Spring" • Friends of Gemini
 "Beach Baby" • Bon Iver

References

External links
 

2012 films
2012 directorial debut films
2012 independent films
2012 romantic comedy-drama films
American independent films
American romantic comedy-drama films
Films about dysfunctional families
Films about writers
Films directed by Josh Boone
Films shot in North Carolina
2010s English-language films
2010s American films